Tetracha virginica, known generally as the Virginia metallic tiger beetle or Virginia big-headed tiger beetle, is a species of big-headed tiger beetle in the family Carabidae. It is found in Central America and North America.

References

Further reading

External links

 

Cicindelidae
Articles created by Qbugbot
Beetles described in 1767
Taxa named by Carl Linnaeus